Acacia aureocrinita is a shrub belonging to the genus Acacia and the subgenus Phyllodineae that is native to parts of eastern Australia.

Description
The shrub often has over four primary erect branches that diverge at the base. The terete brown-green to brown branchlets are ribbed and hairy. It blooms during the warmer months between December and March and produces inflorescences with creamy yellow flowers.

Taxonomy
The species was first formally described by the botanists Barry John Conn and Terry Tame in 1996 in the article A revision of the Acacia uncinata group (Fabaceae-Mimosoideae) as published in the journal Australian Systematic Botany. The only synonym is Racosperma aureocrinitum. It is quite similar to Acacia uncinata in appearance.

Distribution
It is found in south western New South Wales between the Shoalhaven River and Cooma. It is found on ridges and steep valley slopes often as a part of Eucalypts forest communities and grows in stony clay soils.

See also
 List of Acacia species

References

aureocrinita
Flora of New South Wales
Plants described in 1996
Taxa named by Barry John Conn